The Stitch is a proposed engineering project that would see portions of the Downtown Connector in Atlanta, Georgia capped and covered with public greenspaces.

History 

The proposal was first put forward by Central Atlanta Progress (CAP) in August 2016 as a way to reclaim land area taken by the Downtown Connector, a section of Interstate 75 and Interstate 85 that runs through downtown and midtown Atlanta. Similar discussions had been held at CAP as early as 2003 and have included similar proposals for the area near the Georgia State Capitol. The study, prepared for CAP by Jacobs Engineering Group at a cost of $100,000, called for a  stretch of reclaimed land covering a  stretch of the Downtown Connector from Spring Street to Piedmont Avenue in downtown. The study, which compared the project to the Klyde Warren Park in Dallas, said the project would cost approximately $300 million and stimulate approximately $1.1 billion in land development and increased property value. Unlike Klyde Warren Park, The Stitch would involve the creation of multiple parks. The reclaimed land would also allow for the reconnection of Atlanta's street grid, which was interrupted by the construction of the Connector.

Between 2017 and 2018, CAP conducted a year-long viability study on the project that involved Jacobs and John Portman and Associates. In March 2019, the Urban Land Institute (ULI) published a feasibility study on the project, while that same month the estimated cost for the project was stated at $452 million. Advisors from the ULI estimated that the project could take four years of planning and pre-development and six years of construction.

In 2021, the MCP Foundation unveiled a similar proposal that would cover parts of the Interstate in midtown Atlanta, connecting that area of the city to the main campus of the Georgia Institute of Technology, which is located on the other side of the Interstate.

References

Bibliography

External links 

 
 

Transportation in Atlanta
Proposed buildings and structures in Georgia (U.S. state)
Proposed infrastructure in the United States